The Romford Recorder is a local newspaper for the town of Romford, the principal town of the East London Borough of Havering. The Romford Recorder  serves all of Havering.

References

External links
 
 

London newspapers
Media and communications in the London Borough of Havering
Newspapers published in London
Recorder